Maureen S. Walsh (born November 18, 1960) is an American politician who served as a member of the Washington State Senate, representing the 16th district from 2017 to 2021. A member of the Republican Party, she previously served as a member of the Washington House of Representatives from 2005 to 2017.

Career 
She serves on the Human Services, Mental Health and Housing; Health Care; and Transportation committees. On February 8, 2012, the Washington House of Representatives debated on the legalization of same-sex marriage, in which she made an emotional appeal to the legislators which subsequently was shared on social media. The House voted 55–43 in favor of legalizing same-sex marriage.

Walsh was criticized for her opposition to SHB 1155 in April 2019, a state bill that would guarantee nurses the right to uninterrupted meals and rest periods, Walsh argued that the bill should be amended to exclude critical access hospitals that serve less populated areas. This is because she believes that nurses just sit around and play cards.

References

External links 
 Maureen Walsh at ballotpedia.org

1960 births
Living people
Politicians from Cincinnati
University of Cincinnati alumni
People from Walla Walla County, Washington
Republican Party members of the Washington House of Representatives
Women state legislators in Washington (state)
Republican Party Washington (state) state senators
21st-century American politicians
21st-century American women politicians